Thiseio or Thissio is a traditional neighbourhood in the old city of Athens, Greece, northwest of the Acropolis, and surrounded by the archaeological sites of the Agora, Keramikos and Pnyx. The name refers to the Temple of Hephaestus, which was mistakenly known as Thiseion, in reference to Theseus, the mythical king of Athens.

The area is famous for its many pedestrian streets, Acropolis views, archaeological sites, churches, synagogues, cafés, open terraces and cultural meeting points. Thiseio is served by the nearby Thiseio metro station is connected to the other neighbourhoods of the old city of Athens through a network of pedestrian streets passing across the major archaeological sites.

Residential streets
Here is a list of residential streets in the Thiseio area:

Archaeological center
Thiseio is surrounded by hills, heights and historical sites which are within a walking distance. The Ancient Agora of Athens, Stoa of Attalos, the Temple of Hephaestus and Kerameikos Archaeological Museum can be entered from Thiseio; all others: the National Observatory of Athens,  Acropolis of Athens, Philopappos Monument,  Mouseion Hill,  Pnyx, which is considered the birthplace of Democracy and the Mount  Lycabettus can be easily reached or viewed from Thiseio. The panoramic views of them and their natural surroundings from the Areopagus height are spectacular, especially by night.

Historical landmarks
The historical churches of Agia Marina, the church of Agii Assomati, the church of Agios Athanasios Kourkouris and many others are situated in Thiseio. Also, situated in Thiseio are the two synagogues of modern Athens, Etz Chaim or Romaniote Synagogue and the Sepharadi Beth Shalom, the Holocaust Memorial of Athens as well as the ancient Synagogue in the Agora of Athens  inside the archaeological site. 
Beautifully restored neoclassical homes, small streets and many architectural landmarks and archaeological sites make Thiseio one of the most cultural, picturesque, distinguished and peaceful neighbourhoods of Athens and one of the most beautiful viewpoints of Acropolis. 
Due to Thiseio’s position, adjacently to other traditional and historical neighbourhoods and the major archaeological sites, pedestrian-only streets join them. Therefore, Athenians go for a leisurely walk around Thissio and enjoy cultural events and promenades along narrow serpentine-like paths which twist their way through historical sites.

Apostolou Pavlou  is a pedestrianized street which meets Dionysiou Areopagitou Street to form the main pedestrian zone around the archaeological site of Agora from Thiseio to the Acropolis.
There are numerous small and friendly boutique shops, restaurants, cafés where people readily are welcomed and invited to socialize at leisure; all set in a quiet enclave and frequented by both tourists and locals alike. 

As one of the many entertainment centers of the city of Athens, Thiseio is rich in history and culture. It has museums, galleries, the two synagogues of Athens, exhibition centers and open-air theatres and cinemas.

Notable people
Vasilis Avlonitis (1904–1970), actor
Charalabos (Babis) Drossos (1927–2015), Premier League soccer player

The N.O.A Meteorological Station

The National Observatory of Athens handles the most antique meteorological station in Greece and one of the oldest in Southern Europe. The station is located at the center of Athens, in the Thiseio neighbourhood (Hill of Nymphs). The A class Meteorological station has been located at the same position from the 11th of September 1890; while it started its operation in 1858 at a different location in Thiseio.

References

External links
 Informative text in English, attractions, and photos
 William Smith, A Dictionary of Greek and Roman Antiquities, John Murray, London, 1875
 Informative text in English, landmarks and photos

Ancient Agora of Athens
Neighbourhoods in Athens
Squares in Athens